Jeffrey Huber (born 26 June 1959) is a Dutch taekwondo practitioner. He competed in the men's featherweight at the 1988 Summer Olympics.

References

External links
 

1959 births
Living people
Place of birth unknown
Dutch male taekwondo practitioners
Olympic taekwondo practitioners of the Netherlands
Taekwondo practitioners at the 1988 Summer Olympics
20th-century Dutch people
21st-century Dutch people